is a Japanese politician of the Democratic Party for the People, a member of the House of Representatives in the Diet (national legislature). A 1991 graduate of the University of Tokyo, he was elected for the first time in 2007.

References

External links 
 Official website in Japanese.

Living people
1966 births
Democratic Party of Japan politicians
Members of the House of Representatives (Japan)
University of Tokyo alumni